Nightly may refer to:
An event which occurs once every night
A nightly build of any software
The Nightly Show with Larry Wilmore, a late-night panel talk show hosted by Larry Wilmore on Comedy Central
Nightly (band), an alternative pop band from Nashville, Tennessee

See also
Daily (disambiguation)